Haverling Farm House is a historic home located at Bath in Steuben County, New York.  It is a -story, five-bay frame residence built about 1838.  It is a center-hall, Greek Revival-style farmhouse with a gable roof.

It was listed on the National Register of Historic Places in 1983.

References

Houses on the National Register of Historic Places in New York (state)
Greek Revival houses in New York (state)
Houses completed in 1838
Houses in Steuben County, New York
National Register of Historic Places in Steuben County, New York